The Big Bang: The Essential Collection is a compilation album by the Norwegian hard rock band TNT, released in 2003. The compilation mainly focuses on the studio albums the band released in the 1980s, from TNT (1982) to Intuition (1989). Guitarist Ronni Le Tekrø had suggested for the inclusion of several tracks from the 1992 album Realized Fantasies, however only the single "Downhill Racer" was included. No material was included from the band's most recent albums at the time, Firefly (1997) and Transistor (1999). The compilation also includes two newly recorded tracks, "Hey Love" and "Satellite", and an outtake from the Tell No Tales sessions, "Destiny".

The compilation went gold in Norway.

Track listing

Personnel

Band 
Dag Ingebrigtsen – vocals and guitars
Tony Harnell – vocals
Ronni Le Tekrø – guitars, guitar synthesizer, keyboards, 1/4 stepper guitar
Steinar Eikum – bass guitar
Morty Black – bass guitar, pedal synthesizer, fretless bass with reverb and chorus effect on "Forever Shine On"
Diesel Dahl – drums, percussion
Kenneth Odiin – drums, percussion
John Macaluso – drums, percussion

Additional personnel
Bård Svendsen – keyboards, programming and background vocals
Håkon Iversen – background vocals
Bjørn Nessjø – keyboards and programming
Carlos Waadeland – keyboards and programming
Kjetil Bjerkestrand – keyboards
Joe Lynn Turner – background vocals
Dag Stokke – keyboards
Rich Tancredi – keyboards
T.J. Kopetic – keyboards

Album credits 
Bjørn Nessjø – producer (tracks 1-18)
Tony Harnell, Ronni Le Tekrø – producers (tracks 19-20)
Rune Nordahl – engineer
Björn Engelmann at Cutting Room Studios – mastering, remastering
Tommy Hansen – mixing
John Cappadona – front cover artwork
Tor-Erik Ledang – cover design and additional artwork

Sources
http://www.ronniletekro.com/discography-album-18.html

References

Big Bang - The Essential Collection, The
Big Bang - The Essential Collection, The